Neue Stimmen (New Voices) is an international singing competition. It was established in 1987 on the initiative of Liz Mohn with the support of August Everding to promote operas young talent. It is considered an important forum for new talent, one that has marked the beginning of international careers for many participants. The singing competition was hosted every two years by the Bertelsmann Stiftung in Gütersloh, most recently in June 2022.

History 

During the event, Karajan spoke with Liz Mohn about the lack of programs for promoting new opera talent, saying that, compared to other countries, it was difficult to find suitable young singers in Germany. As a result, Mohn, who became a member of the Bertelsmann Stiftung's Advisory Board in 1986, organized an international singing competition. August Everding, general manager of the Bavarian State Theaters, played a key role by providing the specialized knowledge required to hold the event.

Organized together with the managers' committee of the Deutscher Bühnenverein, the association representing Germany's theaters and orchestras, the first competition took place at the Gütersloh Community Center in October 1987. In contrast to other events designed to promote new talent, the Neue Stimmen participants performed on a large stage in a concert hall, which they had to fill vocally. They were also accompanied by a symphony orchestra. In conjunction with the competition, the Bertelsmann Stiftung organized a symposium at which experts debated cultural policy issues. The symposium was also held in subsequent years.

Neue Stimmen was initially a European singing contest since only artists who trained in Europe qualified to participate. One noteworthy aspect is that singers from Eastern Europe competed right from the start. Beginning in the 1990s, artists from other countries also participated, for example from China, Israel, Japan, Korea and the United States. Neue Stimmen thus took on its current international form. The number of participants has grown steadily through the years. Approximately 1,500 applications are now submitted for each competition.

After events in 1987, 1988 and 1989, the organizers began holding competitions every two years. The first master class took place in 1997 and has been held ever since in the years between the competitions. It supports the development of particularly talented singers who have previously competed in Neue Stimmen. In 2012, a lied master class was added, which was also held in 2013 and 2014. The organizers want to use this event to maintain the lied as an art form.

Due to the impact of the global COVID-19 pandemic, the 2020 master class was held entirely digitally for the first time. Participants were given the opportunity to develop both their artistic and career skills in individual and group training sessions via video. In 2022, the New Voices will return to Gütersloh as a presence event. The final concert was accompanied by the Duisburg Philharmonic Orchestra conducted by Jonathan Darlington.

Competition 
The International Singing Competition New Voices has existed for over 30 years. In 2022, around 1400 applicants from over 60 nations took part. Among the requirements was that they were enrolled at a conservatory and had already rehearsed or performed roles. Singers were equally subject to an age limit of 31.

The jury first sifts through the best talents in preliminary selections. The process takes place worldwide under fair and professional conditions, for example in New York City or Cape Town. After the pre-selection, selected participants are invited to Gütersloh and accompanied by repetiteurs. There, the prize winners are determined in a final concert with an orchestra.

Since 2013, there has been a female and male first, second, and third place respectively, which allows for a fairer evaluation of the participants. Sometimes it can happen that two prize winners take the same place if they prove to be equal in front of the jury. There are also promotional, audience, and other special prizes.

The New Voices prize winners receive prize money depending on their placement. In 2022, it was 15,000, 10,000 and 5,000 euros. They are accompanied in the further course of their career, for example in accepting further engagements. Artistic directors and agents use the singing competition as a talent exchange to sign up promising singers.

Jury 
The New Voices jury consists of experienced practitioners from the world of opera and music. Currently, there are five women and four men under the chairmanship of Dominique Meyer.

From 1987 to 1997, August Everding headed the committee. From 1999 to 2001, René Kollo took his place. In 2003, 2005 and 2007, Gérard Mortier was at the helm. Patrons of the singing competition have been Richard von Weizsäcker (1993), Roman Herzog (1995), Rita Süssmuth (1997), Wolfgang Clement (1999) and Peter Ustinov (2001).

Winners 
 1987
First place: Nathalie Stutzmann (contralto)
Second place: Tania Christova (lyric soprano)
Third place: Andrzej Dobber (baritone)

 1988
First place: Izabela Labuda (soprano)
Second place: Heike Theresa Terjung (lyric mezzo-soprano)
Third place:  (coloratura soprano)

 1989
First place: Vesselina Kasarova (mezzo-soprano)
Second place: René Pape (bass)
Third place: Bernard Lombardo (tenor)

 1991
First place: Sonia Zlatkova (soprano)
Second place: Michael Volle (baritone)
Third place: Annette Seiltgen (lyric mezzo-soprano)

 1993
First place: Marina Ivanova (coloratura soprano)
Second place: Laura Polverelli (mezzo-soprano)
Third place:  (lyric soprano)

 1995
First place: Gwyn Hughes Jones (tenor)
Second place: Hanno Müller-Brachmann (bass baritone)
Third place: Sami Luttinen (bass)

 1997
First place:  (soprano)
Second place:  (bass)
Third place: Soon-Won Kang (bass)

 1999
First place: Tina Schlenker (lyric coloratura soprano)
Second place: Andrei Dounaev (tenor)
Third place: Paul Gay (bass baritone)

 2001
First place: Burak Bilgili (bass)
Second place: Woo-Kyung Kim (tenor)
Third place:  (soprano)

 2003
First place: Franco Fagioli (countertenor)
Second place: Maxim Mironov (tenor)
Third place: Song-Hu Liu (lyric baritone)

 2005
First place: Maria Virginia Savastano (soprano)
Second place: Alexey Kudrya (tenor)
Third place: Anna Aglatova (soprano)

 2007
First place: Marina Rebeka (soprano)
Second place: Fernando Javier Radó (bass)
Third place: Diego Torre (tenor)

 2009
First place: Eunju Kwon (soprano)
Second place: Kihwan Sim (bass baritone)
Third place: JunHo You (tenor)

 2011
First place: Olga Bezsmertna (lyric soprano)
Second place: Jongmin Park (bass)
Third place: Xiahou Jinxu (tenor)

 2013
First place: Nicole Car (soprano), Nadine Sierra (soprano), Myong-Hyun Lee (tenor)
Second place: Oleg Tibulco (bass)
Third place: Kristina Mkhitaryan (soprano), Oleksandr Kyreiev (baritone)

 2015
First place: Elsa Dreisig (soprano), Anatoli Sivko (bass)
Second place: Miriam Albano (mezzo-soprano), Darren Pati (tenor)
Third place: Bongiwe Nakani (mezzo-soprano), Lukhanyo Moyake (tenor)

 2017
First place: Svetlina Stoyanova (mezzo-soprano), Cho ChanHee (bass)
Second place: Emily D'Angelo (mezzo-soprano), Johannes Kammler (baritone)
Third place: Zlata Khershberg (mezzo-soprano), Mingjie Lei (tenor)

 2019
 First place:  (sopranp), Long Long (tenor)
 Second place: Natalia Tanasii (soprano), Bongani Justice Kubheka (baritone), Domen Križaj (baritone),
 Third place:  (soprano)

 2022
 First place: Francesca Pia Vitale (soprano), Carles Pachon (baritone)
 Second: Eugénie Joneau (mezzo-soprano), Sakhiwe Mkosana (baritone)
 Third place: Yewon Han (soprano), Dumitru Mitu (tenor)

References

External links 
 
 

Awards established in 1987
Music competitions in Germany
Singing competitions